Pachymerinus froggatti is a species of centipede in the Geophilidae family. It is endemic to Australia, and was first described in 1912 by French myriapodologist Henry Wilfred Brolemann.

Description
The original description of this species is based on a single male specimen measuring 28 mm in length with 55 pairs of legs.

Distribution
The species occurs in coastal New South Wales and Queensland.

Behaviour
The centipedes are solitary terrestrial predators that inhabit plant litter, soil and rotting wood.

References

 

 
froggatti
Centipedes of Australia
Endemic fauna of Australia
Fauna of New South Wales
Fauna of Queensland
Animals described in 1912
Taxa named by Henry Wilfred Brolemann